Miroslav Klose is the all-time top scorer for the Germany national football team, with 71 goals in 137 games between 2001 and 2014. He is also the top scorer in the history of the FIFA World Cup, with 16 goals in 24 appearances across four editions from 2002 to 2014. In the 13 years Klose played for the national team, Germany never lost a game in which he scored.

Klose scored on his debut for Germany, a 2–1 win over Albania on 24 March 2001 during qualification for the 2002 FIFA World Cup. On 13 February 2002, he scored his first international hat-trick, in a 7–1 win over Israel at his then club ground, the Fritz-Walter-Stadion in Kaiserslautern; this was followed by another treble on 18 May in a 6–2 win against Austria. At his first tournament finals, the 2002 FIFA World Cup in South Korea and Japan, Klose scored five goals to become the tournament's joint second top scorer, alongside Brazil's Rivaldo and behind Ronaldo. All of his goals came in the group stage, starting with a headed hat-trick in an 8–0 win against Saudi Arabia at the Sapporo Dome.

Klose netted two goals in the opening game of the 2006 FIFA World Cup, a 4–2 win against Costa Rica, and scored another brace in Germany's final group stage match, a 3–0 win against Ecuador. He finished his second World Cup again with five goals to take the FIFA World Cup Golden Shoe.
On 10 September 2008, during the 2010 FIFA World Cup qualification, he scored the last of his four international hat-tricks, earning a 3–3 draw away to Finland. He scored four goals at the finals in South Africa, including two in a 4–0 quarter-final win over Argentina on his 100th cap.
On 6 June 2014, Klose scored his 69th goal in 132 games in a 6–1 friendly win over Armenia in Mainz, surpassing Gerd Müller's record of 68 goals in 62 games from 1966 to 1974. Klose added two more goals in Germany's victory at the 2014 FIFA World Cup to retire with a record of 71 goals in 137 games. His final goal came in their 7–1 semi-final victory over hosts Brazil, taking him to 16 World Cup goals and surpassing Ronaldo as the tournament's record goalscorer.

In addition to his 16 goals in World Cup finals, Klose scored another 13 in qualification games, as well as three goals in UEFA European Championship finals and 16 in that tournament's qualification matches. The remainder of his goals, 23, were scored in friendly matches. He scored six times against Austria, his highest tally against one country, and also totalled five goals against Azerbaijan and Sweden.

International goals
"Score" represents the score in the match after Klose's goal. "Score" and "Result" list Germany's goal tally first.

Hat-tricks

Breakdown

By year

By competition

See also
 List of men's footballers with 50 or more international goals
 List of FIFA World Cup hat-tricks

References

Germany national football team records and statistics
Klose